Notodytes is a genus of parasitic flies in the family Tachinidae. There are at least three described species in Notodytes.

Species
Notodytes aurea Aldrich, 1934
Notodytes major Aldrich, 1934
Notodytes variabilis Aldrich, 1934

References

Dexiinae
Diptera of South America
Tachinidae genera
Taxa named by John Merton Aldrich